Bratsigovo Hills (‘Bratsigovski Halmove’ \bra-'tsi-gov-ski 'h&l-mo-ve\) is the chain of rocky hills rising to over 400 m on the southeast side of Cugnot Ice Piedmont and extending from the coast of Prince Gustav Channel 4 km northwards on Trinity Peninsula in Graham Land, Antarctica.

The hills are named after the town of Bratsigovo in Southern Bulgaria.

Location
German-British mapping in 1996.

Maps
 Trinity Peninsula. Scale 1:250000 topographic map No. 5697. Institut für Angewandte Geodäsie and British Antarctic Survey, 1996.
 Antarctic Digital Database (ADD). Scale 1:250000 topographic map of Antarctica. Scientific Committee on Antarctic Research (SCAR), 1993–2016.

Notes

References
 Bratsigovo Hills. SCAR Composite Antarctic Gazetteer
 Bulgarian Antarctic Gazetteer. Antarctic Place-names Commission. (details in Bulgarian, basic data in English)

External links
 Bratsigovo Hills. Copernix satellite image

Hills of Trinity Peninsula
Bulgaria and the Antarctic